Christian Andrés Suárez Valencia (born November 2, 1985 in Guayaquil) is an Ecuadorian footballer who last played for Guayaquil City.

Club career
Suárez began his career with Deportivo Azogues in the Serie A of Ecuador. After his performances with the team, he soon got the attention of many clubs especially LDU Quito.

In 2008, Suárez transferred to LDU Quito as part of the squad who won the Copa Libertadores. Unfortunately, Suárez had little playing time and was only used as a substitute.

In 2009, Suárez joined Olmedo. He played regularly for the team as an attacking midfielder and set his teammates up to score goals. He finished the season with 10 impressive goals which made Olmedo take their option to buy him permanently.

In 2010, Suárez was loaned to El Nacional. He started the season as first choice striker where he didn't disappoint and became one of the league's top scorers. He ended the season with 12 goals.

In 2015, Suárez joined Atlas.

Club Necaxa
On December 14, 2010 Christian Suárez completed his transfer to Necaxa of Mexico, same club where legendary Ecuadorian midfielder, Alex Aguinaga, played. He scored his first goals coming in a game against Toluca in which he scored twice to give Necaxa a 2–3 victory.
Santos Laguna

Santos Laguna
In May 2011, Suárez joined Santos Laguna of the Primera División Mexicana after Necaxa was relegated. Suárez occupied the extracomunitary player placer left by his compatriot Christian Benítez, who joined Club América.
Suarez reached the Apertura 2011 League Final but came in second place to Tigres. After scoring 5 goals in the 2011–12 CONCACAF Champions League, Suarez again lost the final, this time to Club de Futbol Monterrey. After reaching his third final in Mexican football, Suarez won his first title with Santos Laguna, winning the Apertura 2012, against Monterrey.

International career
Suárez was called up on October 12, 2010 to play against Poland. He scored his first international goal in a 2–0 friendly win versus Costa Rica on August 10, 2011.

International goals

Honors

Club
LDU Quito
Copa Libertadores (1): 2008

Santos Laguna
Mexican Primera División (1): Clausura 2012

References

1985 births
Living people
Sportspeople from Guayaquil
Association football wingers
Ecuadorian footballers
Ecuador international footballers
Deportivo Azogues footballers
L.D.U. Quito footballers
C.D. Olmedo footballers
C.D. El Nacional footballers
Club Necaxa footballers
Santos Laguna footballers
C.F. Pachuca players
Barcelona S.C. footballers
Atlas F.C. footballers
Dorados de Sinaloa footballers
Guayaquil City F.C. footballers
Ecuadorian Serie A players
Liga MX players
Ecuadorian expatriate footballers
Expatriate footballers in Mexico